The Savannah Invitational is a college basketball tournament founded in 2016 that is held at the Savannah Civic Center in Savannah, Georgia. The event includes both a men′s and a women′s tournament.

2016

Men's tournament
The men's tournament took place November 20-26. The eight participating teams were divided into two brackets, a "host" bracket and a "visitors" bracket. Each of the four "host" teams hosted two of the "visitors" teams in games on their campuses in the first two rounds of the tournament on November 20 and 22. Regardless of the results of those two rounds, the four "host" teams then met one another in a bracketed tournament in Savannah in the third and championship rounds on November 25 and 26. Meanwhile, the four "visitor" teams also met in Savannah on November 25 and 26 to play a non-bracketed round-robin among themselves, with no championship awarded to them.

Campus games

Host bracket

Visitors bracket

Women's tournament
The women's tournament was played November 22–24. The format was a three-round round-robin, with all games played in Savannah.

2017

Men's tournament
In 2017, the men's event was played November 11-26. As in 2016, the eight participating teams were divided into a "Host" bracket and a "Visitors" bracket. In the first round, held on November 11 and November 19, each of the four "Host" bracket teams played a home game on its campus against one of the four "Visitors" bracket teams. "Visitor" bracket team North Carolina Wesleyan played no further games in the Invitational, and "Host" team UNC Wilmington had a bye in the second round, but the other three "hosts" played another on-campus game against another of the three remaining "visitors" in the second round, held on November 21. Regardless of the results of these two rounds the four "host" teams then met in Savannah to play one another on November 24-25. Unlike in 2016, the "Host" teams met in a two-round round-robin "Hosts' Showcase" event in Savannah rather than in a bracketed tournament, a change made because "Host" bracket team Valparaiso had made a late move from the Horizon League to the Missouri Valley Conference, to which "Host" bracket team Loyola–Chicago also belonged; NCAA regulations prohibited teams from the same conference participating in the same in-season non-conference tournament, and the round-robin "showcase" format allowed the Invitational both to comply with NCAA non-conference tournament regulations and to ensure no meeting between Valparaiso and Loyola-Chicago. As a result of the non-bracketed "showcase" format, no championship was awarded in the "Host" bracket in 2017. Meanwhile, the three remaining "Visitor" bracket teams met at the Pete Hanna Center on the campus of Samford University in Birmingham, Alabama, on November 24, 25, and 26 to play one another in the "Visitors Subregional," a non-bracketed round-robin with no championship awarded.

Campus games

Hosts' Showcase

Visitors' Subregional

Women's tournament
The women's tournament was played November 21-23. The format was a three-round round-robin.

References

2016 establishments in Georgia (U.S. state)
2017 disestablishments in Georgia (U.S. state)
Basketball in Georgia (U.S. state)
Sports in Savannah, Georgia
Sports competitions in Georgia (U.S. state)
College basketball competitions
College men's basketball competitions in the United States
College women's basketball competitions in the United States
Recurring sporting events established in 2016
Recurring sporting events disestablished in 2017